This article details the Bradford Bulls rugby league football club's 2021 season. This is the Bulls' third consecutive season in the Championship.

Season review

June 2020

The preparation for the 2021 season started with the re-signing of experienced coach John Kear on a two-year extension which would keep him at the Bradford Bulls until the end of the 2022 season. Following this news, the Bulls announced that Super League veteran halfback Danny Brough would join the club on a 2-year deal from Wakefield Trinity linking up with John Kear for a third time.

July 2020
Vice captain Sam Hallas and homegrown fullback Brandon Pickersgill both signed one year deals to stay at the club for the 2021 season. Winger Joe Brown also signed an extension to stay with the Bulls.

August 2020
Due to the reserves being suspended until 2022 young halfback Cobi Green signed for Swinton Lions. Soon after Green's departure the Bulls announced the re-signing of second-row forwards Brad Gallagher and Ebon Scurr, Gallagher signed a two-year extension whilst Scurr signed for one year. French prop forward Levy Nzoungou also signed a one-year extension to his contract. Young hooker Thomas Doyle was the next player to sign an extension with the Bulls, signing on for another season. Luke Littlewood was the next player to leave the club due to no reserve grade for 2021, the young halfback signed for RFL League 1 side Rochdale Hornets, coached by former Bull Matt Calland. Bradford announced their second signing for the new season in the form of Huddersfield Giants second rower Aaron Murphy who signed a two-year deal with the club.

September 2020
The month started with the news that winger Matty Dawson-Jones had taken up the option in his contract to stay an extra year at the Bulls after finishing last year's cancelled season as Bradford's top try scorer. However last season's top point scorer Rowan Milnes was called back to his parent club Hull Kingston Rovers thus terminating his loan with the Bulls. Winger David Foggin-Johnston signed an extension to his contract to keep him at the Bulls until the end of 2021. Second row forward Connor Farrell announced his retirement from the sport due to ongoing injuries. Following this news the Bulls signed Doncaster R.L.F.C. second rower Brad England on a one-year deal. Pack members Anthony England and George Flanagan both signed extensions with the club, prop forward England signed a two-year deal whilst hooker Flanagan signed a one-year deal. Second rower Adam Rooks who was at the club on loan last season from Hull KR put pen to paper on a one-year permanent deal. Former Bulls centre Rhys Evans signed a two-year deal with the club following a short stint at Leeds Rhinos.

October 2020 
There was positive news to start the month as the Bulls announced that they had retained reserve grade players Matthew Race, Cameron Berry and Bradley Ho for the 2021 season. The fourth reserve grade player to sign up for the new season was centre/second row Sam Smith. It was announced that homegrown prop forward Liam Kirk had signed for fellow Championship side Oldham R.L.F.C. ending his 5-year stint at the club. Another young reserve grade player in winger Murphy Smith signed up to the 2021 squad by signing a one-year deal.

November 2020
The Bulls revealed that the new kit supplier for the next two years would be Steeden after spending the last two seasons with Kappa. The sixth new signing for the upcoming season was the former England Youth international wing/centre Reece Hamlett who signed a one-year deal with the club from Super League side Warrington Wolves. Another young reserve grade player in Billy Jowitt was retained by the club for the 2021 season. Following the decision to expel Toronto Wolfpack from the Super League the Bulls announced that they would be applying for the 12th place in the 2021 Super League season along with the likes of Leigh Centurions, Featherstone Rovers, Toulouse Olympique and York City Knights. Chairman Mark Sawyer stated that a return to Odsal Stadium would be a key factor in applying for the Super League. Highly rated young Hull Kingston Rovers winger Elliot Wallis signed for Bradford on a year long loan deal in order to gain some first team experience. Former prop forward Dan Fleming who was at the club in 2015 and 2016 signed a one-year deal after a short stint at Castleford Tigers.

December 2020
Young homegrown second rower Evan Hodgson signed for RFL League 1 side Newcastle Thunder. The Bulls application to Super League XXVI was not a success as Leigh Centurions were selected to be the 12th side for the 2021 Super League season. Bradford also released their away kit which consists on Black and Red vertical stripes.

January 2021
There was no news in January.

February 2021
The Bulls announced that they would play local League 1 side Keighley Cougars in a friendly in order to prepare for the 2021 season. Following this, the first round of the 2021 Challenge Cup was drawn with the Bulls travelling to Featherstone Rovers, the winners of the tie would then face either Halifax Panthers or Batley Bulldogs in the second round. Bradford announced their 2021 squad numbers with veteran new signing Danny Brough taking the number 6 shirt with Aaron Murphy wearing the number 12. The Bulls revealed they would play one more friendly against Swinton Lions before the season begun.

March 2021
Bradford's 2021 campaign started with a 22–26 loss in the first pre-season friendly against Swinton Lions, first half tries from Brandon Pickersgill and Ross Oakes with two conversions from Danny Brough gave the Bulls a 12–6 lead at half time however further tries from George Flanagan and Matty Dawson-Jones could not prevent a loss. The Bulls announced the signing of 22 year old wing/centre Jack Sanderson from Castleford Tigers on a one-year deal, Sanderson will wear the squad number 25 for the upcoming season. Bradford finished their pre-season off with an unconvincing 22–18 win over local rivals Keighley Cougars, tries came from Thomas Doyle, Danny Brough, Ross Oakes and Anthony Walker. Trialist Anthony Walker earned himself a permanent contract with the Bulls after impressing during the pre-season. Bradford's first competitive match in 373 days ended in a 41–16 defeat to Featherstone Rovers in the first round in the 2021 Challenge Cup. Following this defeat it was announced that the Bulls had signed former loanee Ben Evans from Toulouse Olympique in order to bolster the options in the front row.

April 2021
Prop forward Anthony England announced his retirement from the sport at the age of 34 due to ongoing injuries. The opening game of the Championship season saw the Bulls on the end of a 50–12 defeat to the Sheffield Eagles. Super League side Hull Kingston Rovers announced that Elliot Wallis would be returning to the club after a short loan spell with the Bulls. Bradford won their first game of the season in a hard-fought 27–26 victory over local rivals Halifax Panthers, halfback Jordan Lilley kicked a late drop goal to ensure the win for the Bulls. Young prop forward Bradley Ho was granted a season long loan move to RFL League 1 side Coventry Bears. The Bulls made it back to back wins with a comprehensive 35–14 win over ground sharing side Dewsbury Rams, halfback Brough made his 500th career appearance and marked the occasion with a try and a drop goal.

May 2021
Bradford kept their winning streak going with a difficult trip to Whitehaven R.L.F.C. as they came out 30-22 winners. Captain Steve Crossley led the way with two tries whilst Joe Brown, Brandon Pickersgill and Ebon Scurr all scoring as well. The Bulls made it four wins in five with a tense 23–22 win over Swinton Lions. Danny Brough, Thomas Doyle, David Foggin-Johnston and Pickersgill all scored tries whilst Jordan Lilley secured the game winning drop goal. The scheduled game against Newcastle Thunder was rearranged to ensure that fans could attend as the government prepared to ease lockdown rules. The Bulls announced the permanent signing of former player Elliot Kear from Super League side Salford Red Devils as Kear wished to go part-time in order to train to be a fireman. Long serving Football Manager Stuart Duffy announced his retirement after 23 years in the role after suffering a bout of ill health. Young centre Joe Burton signed a 1 and a half year professional deal with the club. Bradford announced the loan signing of Warrington Wolves forward Ellis Robson for a two-week period, meanwhile the Bulls also revealed they had signed Hull F.C. back Mitieli Vulikijapani on a two-week loan. During this month the Rugby Football League announced that along with Castleford Tigers and Hull Kingston Rovers the Bulls would not be granted an elite academy license after this season. 300 travelling fans saw the Bulls beat London Broncos 33–8 in the capital with loan signing Robson the stand out player scoring two tries. Academy product Oliver Wilson and fullback Ashton Golding both signed two-week loan deals with the Bulls from Super League side Huddersfield Giants. New centre Reece Hamlett signed with Swinton Lions on a loan deal. After spending a year and a half at Crown Flatt, the Bulls made their long-awaited return to their home Odsal Stadium with a dominant 37–18 win against rivals York City Knights, youngster Joe Brown led the way with two tries but Danny Brough's eight goals sealed the win.

June 2021
The upcoming match against Toulouse Olympique was cancelled due to travel restrictions from France regarding the ongoing Covid-19 pandemic. The Rugby Football League announced that the Bulls were granted a probationary elite license for their academy for a two-year period, renegading on their decision to take that license away. Bradford made it seven wins a row with a 31–12 victory over newly promoted Newcastle Thunder, Steve Crossley, Thomas Doyle, Jordan Lilley, Ellis Robson and Anthony Walker all scored tries for the Bulls whilst Lilley and Danny Brough kicked 5 goals between them. However the Bulls suffered a serious blow as star halfback Brough was ruled out for 12–14 weeks with a bicep injury. Loan signing Mitieli Vulikijapani was recalled by parent club Hull F.C. due to injury problems. Huddersfield Giants also recalled Ashton Golding and Oliver Wilson due to a number of positive Covid tests in their squad. The Bulls winning streak came to an end as the injury hit Bulls were ruthlessly taken apart by unbeaten Featherstone Rovers in a 44-0 riot. Young forward Ethan O'Hanlon was loaned out to League 1 side North Wales Crusaders. Warrington Wolves recalled second rower Ellis Robson as their squad was depleted due to the England vs Combined All Stars match. With the injury to Brough, the Bulls announced the loan signing of former halfback Joe Keyes on a 2-week deal from Hull Kingston Rovers. The Bulls suffered back to back defeats for the first time this season as they lost 25–12 to Widnes Vikings, youngster Scurr and prop Walker scored the tries for Bradford.

July 2021

Bradford got back to winning ways with a hard-fought 30–16 win over 3rd placed Batley Bulldogs however they lost halfback Jordan Lilley to a rib injury. After the victory over Batley the Bulls announced that the loan deal for scrum half Joe Keyes was extended on a week by week basis. The following week Bradford were ruthless as they dismantled Oldham R.L.F.C. in a 54-22 thrashing, Keyes was the man of the match with a hat-trick of tries and nine goals in a 30-point haul. Young halfback Matthew Race was sent on loan to North Wales Crusaders in order to gain some first team experience. One again Hull Kingston Rovers allowed halfback Keyes to stay with the Bulls for an extra month following some good performances. In what could be described as the game of the season so far the Bulls fell agonizingly short to the unbeaten Featherstone Rovers in a thrilling 30–36 loss which was only settled by a late Dane Chisholm interception. The Bulls announced that they had signed former loanee and current York City Knights player Jordan Baldwinson one a one-week loan deal.

Milestones
 CCR1: Reece Hamlett, Jack Sanderson, Danny Brough, Brad England and Anthony Walker made their debuts for the Bulls.
 CCR1: Reece Hamlett and Ebon Scurr scored their 1st try for the Bulls.
 CCR1: Danny Brough kicked his 1st goal for the Bulls.
 Round 1: Aaron Murphy and Billy Jowitt made their debuts for the Bulls.
 Round 1: Joe Brown scored his 1st try for the Bulls.
 Round 2: Daniel Fleming scored his 1st try for the Bulls.
 Round 3: Danny Brough and Brad England scored their 1st try for the Bulls.
 Round 3: Ross Oakes scored his 25th try and reached 100 points for the Bulls.
 Round 3: Danny Brough kicked his 1st drop goal for the Bulls.
 Round 4: Brandon Pickersgill scored his 25th try and reached 100 points for the Bulls.
 Round 5: Joe Burton made his debut for the Bulls.
 Round 7: Mitieli Vulikijapani and Ellis Robson made their debuts for the Bulls.
 Round 7: Ellis Robson and Aaron Murphy scored their 1st try for the Bulls.
 Round 8: Ashton Golding made his debut for the Bulls.
 Round 8: Ashton Golding scored his 1st try for the Bulls.
 Round 6: Anthony Walker scored his 1st try for the Bulls.
 Round 6: Jordan Lilley reached 100 points for the Bulls.
 Round 12: Joe Burton scored his 1st try for the Bulls.
 Round 13: Joe Keyes scored his 25th try for the Bulls.
 Round 14: George Flanagan kicked his 1st goal for the Bulls.
 Round 15: Sam Hallas kicked his 1st goal for the Bulls.
 Round 15: George Flanagan kicked his 1st drop goal for the Bulls.
 Round 17: George Flanagan made his 50th appearance for the Bulls.
 Round 18: Bradley Ho made his debut for the Bulls.
 Round 18: George Flanagan scored his 25th try and reached 100 points for the Bulls.
 Round 19: Masimbaashe Matongo made his debut for the Bulls.
 Round 19: Rhys Evans scored his 1st hat-trick for the Bulls.
 Round 19: Danny Brough reached 100 points for the Bulls.
 Round 20: Ethan O'Hanlon made his debut for the Bulls.
 Round 21: Eldon Myers made his debut for the Bulls.
 Round 22: Sam Hallas made his 100th appearance for the Bulls.

Pre-season friendlies

Bulls' score is first.

Player appearances
 Friendly games only

 = Injured

 = Suspended

RFL Championship

2021 Championship

Player appearances

 = Injured

 = Suspended

Challenge Cup

Player appearances

Squad statistics

 Appearances and points include (Championship, Challenge Cup and Play-offs) as of 25 September 2021.

Transfers

In

Out

Notes

Explanatory notes

Citations 

2021 in English rugby league
Bradford Bulls seasons